Damoy Point is a headland  west-northwest of Flag Point, the northern entrance point to the harbour of Port Lockroy, on the western side of Wiencke Island in the Palmer Archipelago of Antarctica. It was discovered and named by the French Antarctic Expedition, 1903–05, under Jean-Baptiste Charcot.

Damoy Point Hut
A well-preserved hut containing scientific equipment and other artifacts stands at the point. It was built in 1973 and used for several years as a British summer air facility and transit station for scientific personnel. It was last occupied in 1993. It has been designated a Historic Site or Monument (HSM 84), following a proposal by the United Kingdom to the Antarctic Treaty Consultative Meeting.

See also
 List of Antarctic field camps

References

External links 
 Secretariat of the Antarctic Treaty Visitor Guidelines and island description

Wiencke Island
Headlands of the Palmer Archipelago
Historic Sites and Monuments of Antarctica